Wor Nanny's a mazer is a famous Geordie folk song written in the 19th century by Thomas “Tommy” Armstrong, in a style deriving from music hall. It is regarded by many as one of the classics.

This song tells the tale of a husband and wife setting out on a train trip from Rowlands Gill, a village in County Durham, to “toon” - meaning 'town', presumably Newcastle upon Tyne - to do some shopping. The trip starts to go wrong when they miss their train. The pair end up in a pub where the wife becomes “a bit the worse for wear”. We are left to assume no shopping was done and no clothes bought.

Lyrics

Places mentioned 
Rowlands Gill is a village situated between Winlaton Mill and Blackhall Mill, on the north bank of the River Derwent, previously in County Durham but now in Newcastle upon Tyne, England
This is the only place mentioned by name. It is not known either where they started their journey, or where they intended to do their shopping, although Newcastle upon Tyne would be an educated guess as it is locallyreferredto as the toon.
As Rowlands Gill was not a rail interchange, it has to be assumed that they travelled the first part of their journey by means other than rail.
The Derwent Valley Railway was started in 1865 and the line was opened on 2 December 1867. The line (part single track) ran between Blackhill and Derwenthaugh on the River Tyne where it joined the Newcastle upon Tyne to Carlisle rail track.
Even the name of the pubbilick hoose was not given.

Comments on variations to the above version 

In the early 19th century, as today, there were cheap books and magazines.
Many of these “chapbooks” were on poor quality paper to a poor standard and with poor quality print. *The works were copied with no thoughts of copyright, and the work required very little proof-reading, and what was done was not required to a high standard. Consequently, the dialect words of songs varied between editions.
As this was a very popular song, it appeared in numerous editions. The many versions published show considerable, some very minor, variations, mainly in the spelling of the words, and sometimes variations within the same edition. Some of the most common are listed below:

Generally

 aa'd, aa had
 afore, before
 alang, along
 an, an', and
 any, ony
 aroond, around
 ay, aye
 beer, beor
 bitter, bittor
 both, byeth
 called, called
 claes, clathes
 com, come
 convaince, conveyance
 couldn't, cudden't, cuddent
 doon, down
 feel, felt
 feyce, fyece
 first, forst
 gan, bannin'
 gone, gyen
 good, gud
 hard, heard
 heh, hev
 heor, here
 her, hor
 hyem, hyeme
 inti, into
 iss, us
 lang, long
 leeve, live
 made, myed
 maisor, mazer, mazor
 Nan, nannie, nanny
 never, nivor, nivvor
 o', of
 paper, papor
 parlor, parlour
 pubbilick hoose, public hoose, public house
 rang, rung
 really, reely
 saa, saw
 same, seym, syem
 says, sez
 shaal, shawl
 shame, shyem
 sic, such
 stoot, stout
 swallied, swalleyed
 thoo, thou
 took, teuk, tuek
 trouble, trubble
 varra, varry, very
 wad, would
 wadden't, waddent, wouldn't
 was, wes
 wer, wor
 wersels, worels
 wi, with
 with, wiv
 yersel, yorsel

Specific differences

Chorus line 1 "And" is added to the start of the line	
Chorus line 2 ends with "she remains" instead of "she'll remain"	
Chorus line 3 "And" is added to the start of the line	
Chorus line 4 starts with "aa'll nivvor" instead of "aa winnet"	
Verse 1 line 3 "For" is added to the start of the line	
Verse 1 line 7 "was ne mair" is substituted by wasn't another one"	
Verse 1 line 8 The time period varies from fifteen to seventeen minutes	
Verse 1 line 9 "An" or "An" is added to the start of the line	
Verse 1 line 12 "gan in" is substituted by "gan on"	
Verse 1 line 12 "So" is omitted from the start of the line but "we'll" is added before "gan"	
Verse 1 line 15 "hev" is substituted by "git" and later "warmed" by "warm"	
Verse 1 line 17 "But" is added to the start of the line and later the line changed from "aa knew she'd not waak" to "aa knew she couldn't walk"	
Verse 1 line 20 - the line starts "Aa's like te" instead of "If aa like aa cud"	
Verse 2 line 1 "doon" is substituted by "away"	
Verse 2 line 3 "te" is substituted by "inti"	
Verse 2 line 4 "in" is substituted by "heor"	
Verse 2 line 7 "drink" is substituted by "hev"	
Verse 2 line 8 "And" is substituted by "Why"	
Verse 2 line 11 & 12 changed from "But after she swalleyed three parts of hor gill, She said, "Bob, man, aa'd rather hev gin" to "An afore she'd swallied a haaf o' hors, She said, "Aa wad rethur hev gin"	
Verse 2 line 14 changed from "And she gobbled it up the forst try" to "she swallied it doon the forst try:"	
Verse 2 line 15 "Says aa te wor Nan" is substituted by "Aa sez to wor Nan"	
Verse 3 line 3 "Why" is omitted from the start of the line	
Verse 3 line 4 The "three" gills becomes "two" or more than three gills	
Verse 3 line 6 "hoyed" is substituted by "tossed"	
Verse 3 line 7 & 8 changed from "Aa thowt she was gan te gan wrang in her mind, so aa sat mesef close by the door" to "Aa thowt wor Nan was gan' Wrang iv hor mind so aa set mesel near the door"	
Verse 3 line 17 "for" is omitted before "te sing" and the 'Cat Pie' becomes 'The Cat Pie'	
Verse 4 line 1 changed from "The landlord says" to "He sez te me"	
Verse 4 line 6 changed from "acroos" to "ower"	
Verse 4 line 7 changed from "And Nan, poor sowl" to "An poor aad Nan"	
Verse 4 line 8 changed from " tummelled" to "hoyed"	
verse 4 line 9 "And" is added to the start of the line	
Verse 4 line 11 changed from "for te lift" to "ta lift"	
verse 4 line 12 "And" is added to the start of the line	
Verse 4 line 13 changed from "ride" to "lift"	
Verse 4 line 14 changed from "lifted" to "hoisted"	
Verse 4 line 15 changed from "But Nan was that tight, she" to "She was that tight that she"	
verse 4 line 17 "And" is added between "sit up" and "she" instead of the comma	
verse 4 line 18 "And" is added to the start of the line	
Verse 4 line 19 changed from "hor new basket" to "a new basket"	
Verse 4 line 20 changed from "That mornin' wi lossin' the train" to "That wummin, wi lossin' the train."

Recordings
  Alex Glasgow (1935–2001) was one of the North of England's most popular folk  singers in his day. His CD entitled “Alex Glasgow - Songs Vol - now and then” recorded in 1970 (ref MWMCDSP21) included “Wor Nanny’s a Mazer” together with 28 other titles
 Bob Fox and Benny Graham include the song on their album "How Are You Off For Coals?", along with several more of Tommy Armstrong's songs. (Fellside Records catalogue number FECD111)
 YouTube recording 
 YouTube recording of

See also
Geordie dialect words

References 

English folk songs
Songs related to Newcastle upon Tyne
19th-century songs
Northumbrian folklore
Year of song unknown